Sodium perchlorate is the inorganic compound with the chemical formula NaClO4. It is a white crystalline, hygroscopic solid that is highly soluble in water and in alcohol. It is usually encountered as the monohydrate.  The compound is noteworthy as the most water-soluble of the common perchlorate salts.

Sodium perchlorate and other perchlorates has been found on the planet Mars, first detected by the NASA probe Phoenix in 2009. This was later confirmed by spectral analysis by the Mars Reconnaissance Orbiter in 2015 of what is thought to be brine seeps which may be the first evidence of flowing liquid water containing hydrated salts on Mars.

Selected properties
Its heat of formation is −382.75 kJ/mol, i.e. it is favorable for it to decompose into sodium chloride and dioxygen.  It crystallizes in the rhombic crystal system.

Uses
Sodium perchlorate is the precursor to many other perchlorate salts, often taking advantage of their low solubility relative to NaClO4 (209 g/100 mL at 25 °C). Perchloric acid is made by treating NaClO4 with HCl.

Ammonium perchlorate and potassium perchlorate, of interest in rocketry and pyrotechnics, are prepared by double decomposition from a solution of sodium perchlorate and ammonium chloride or potassium chloride, respectively.

Laboratory applications
Solutions of NaClO4 are often used as an unreactive electrolyte. It is used in standard DNA extraction and hybridization reactions in molecular biology.

In medicine
Sodium perchlorate can be used to block iodine uptake before administration of iodinated contrast agents in patients with subclinical hyperthyroidism (suppressed TSH).

Production
Sodium perchlorate is produced by anodic oxidation of sodium chlorate (NaClO3) at an inert electrode, such as platinum.

 Na+ClO3− + H2O   → Na+ClO4− + 2H+ + 2 e− (acidic medium)

 Na+ClO3− + 2 OH−   →  Na+ClO4− +  H2O + 2 e− (alkaline medium)

Safety
LD50 is 2 – 4 g/kg (rabbits, oral).

See also
 Potassium chlorate

References

External links
WebBook page for NaClO4

Perchlorates
Sodium compounds
Deliquescent substances